KLK Calling PTZ – The Red Orchestra (alternate title: KLK To PTX - The Red Band; German: KLK an PTX – Die Rote Kapelle) is a 1971 East German film about the history of the Red Orchestra espionage ring.

Plot
After Hitler's rise to power in 1933, a group of regime opponents from various backgrounds consolidated under the leadership of Harro Schulze-Boysen and Arvid Harnack. They gather intelligence and pass it on to other countries. After the outbreak of the Second World War, and especially after the German invasion of the Soviet Union, they intensify their work. In August 1942, the Gestapo arrests Boysen and soon after cracks down on the spy ring.

Cast
 Horst Drinda: Arvid Harnack
 Irma Münch: Mildred Harnack
 Horst Schulze: Adam Kuckhoff
 Barbara Adolph: Greta Kuckhoff
 Klaus Piontek: Harro Schulze-Boysen
 Jutta Wachowiak: Libertas Schulze-Boysen
 Harry Pietzsch: Walter Küchenmeister
 Karin Lesch: Elfriede Paul
 Marylu Poolman: Elisabeth Schumacher
 Eberhard Esche: Kurt Schumacher
 Katharina Lind: Oda Schottmüller
 Günther Simon: John Sieg
 Jessy Rameik: Sophie Sieg
 Ursula Karusseit: Hilde Coppi
 Manfred Karge: Hans Coppi
 Leon Niemczyk: Vincente Douglas
 Siegfried Weiss: Wilhelm Canaris
 Alfred Müller: Wolfgang Langhoff
 Hannjo Hasse: guest in the American Embassy
 Alfred Struwe: Bellini
 Peter Sturm: Krapotschkin
 Horst Giese: Schröder

Production
Writer Claus Küchenmeister and his wife Wera began conducting interviews with former members of the Red Orchestra during 1966. Claus, son of the executed organization member  Walter Küchenmeister, intended to make a documentary about the activities of his father. When officials in the Ministry of State Security's Department of Agitation heard of his project, he was granted full government support and access to previously undisclosed materials in the Ministry's archives. Rather than documentary, a full-length feature film was commissioned.

Reception
KLK Calling PTZ was distributed in fifty-eight copies, and sold 2,107,093 tickets in the first year after its release.

On 4 October 1971, director Horst E. Brandt, cinematographer Günter Haubold and the Küchenmeister couple were awarded the National Prize 1st class for their work on the film. They, dramatist Anne Pfeuffer and actors Horst Drinda, Irma Münch, Horst Schulze, Klaus Piontek, Barbara Adolph, Jutta Wachowiak, Manfred Karge, Ursula Karusseit, Harry Pietzsch, Eberhard Esche and Günther Simon were all granted the Art Prize of the Free German Trade Union Federation in the same year.

Daniela Bergahn noted that, while the film still "inflated" the role of the communists in the resistance to the Nazis, it "at least acknowledged" the participation of other groups. In 1972, the West German story version was disseminated in the television mini series "Die rote Kapelle".

References

External links
KLK Calling PTZ - The Red Orchestra on the IMDb.

1971 films
1970s spy films
German spy films
East German films
1970s German-language films
Films set in Berlin
German black-and-white films
Films about the German Resistance
World War II spy films
World War II films based on actual events
1970s German films